Thamudic, named for the Thamud tribe, is an extinct language known from large numbers of inscriptions in Ancient North Arabian (ANA) alphabets, which have not yet been properly studied. These texts are found over a huge area from southern Syria to Yemen. 
In 1937, Fred V. Winnett divided those known at the time into five rough categories A, B, C, D, E.
In 1951, some 9,000 more inscriptions were recorded in south-west Saudi Arabia which have been given the name Southern Thamudic.

Thamudic A is now known as Taymanitic.
Thamudic E is now known as Hismaic.
Southern Thamudic is also known as Thamudic F.

Varieties

Thamudic B 
The Thamudic B inscriptions are concentrated in Northwest Arabia, but can be occasionally found in Syria, Egypt, and Yemen.

Thamudic C 
The Thamudic C inscriptions are concentrated in the Najd, but can be found elsewhere across western Arabia as well.

Thamudic D 
Thamudic D inscriptions are concentrated in northwest Arabia, and one occurs alongside a Nabataean tomb inscription in Hegra (Mada'in Salih) dated to the year 267 CE.

Thamudic F (Southern Thamudic) 
Thamudic F texts come from the southwestern part of the Arabian Peninsula and seem to contain only names, although some of these names contain mimation and one example of a hl- */hal/ definite article.

References

Further reading

External links
Smithsonian National Museum of Natural History - Pre-Islamic Period Inscriptions - Thamudic
Article from the Departmental Journal published by the Arab Writers Union in Damascus (in Arabic)

History of Saudi Arabia
Ancient North Arabian